Thunder Valley Casino Resort is a hotel and casino located in unincorporated Placer County in Whitney, California near the city of Lincoln, California, 30 miles (48 km) northeast of Sacramento. It is owned and operated by the United Auburn Indian Community and designed by architect Edward Vance of JMA Architecture Studios, located in Las Vegas, Nevada. The resort opened on June 9, 2003. It was operated by Station Casinos from 2003 to 2010.

The 275,000-square-foot (25,550 m²) facility offers a variety of gaming including slot machines, live poker and various other table games.

History
Thunder Valley Casino Resort is owned by the United Auburn Indian Community, a Native American tribe consisting of mostly Miwuk and Maidu Indians indigenous to the Sacramento Valley region. In the 1950s and '60s, the United States government terminated 41 California rancherias—mini-reservations, including that of the Miwok and Maidu Auburn band. As a way to lift themselves out of poverty, the members of the tribe decided to build a casino after Congress restored the tribe's federal status in 1994, allowing the tribe to acquire land under tribal sovereignty.

The United Auburn Indian Community entered into a tribal-state gaming compact with the State of California in September 1999 in order to conduct Class III gaming on trust land. This compact was later successfully renegotiated with Governor Arnold Schwarzenegger in 2004.

Thunder Valley was designed by JMA Architecture Studios and built by the PENTA Building Group. The casino was opened in June 2003 and then expanded starting in March 2009 and finishing July 2010.

The UAIC is known for their efforts to abide by state and local land-use laws, even though they are not obligated to do so under sovereignty law. For example, the UAIC chose to include the California Environmental Quality Act in its local agreement, something only a handful of tribes submit to.

Gambling

The casino has over 3,000 slot and video machines, 125 table games (including blackjack and paigow) and a live poker room with enough space for 160 players. The casino regularly holds promotions and special events including drawings, cash prizes, and tournaments.

Attractions 
The expansion completed in July 2010 includes a 17-story luxury hotel with 408 rooms, with 46 suites. Inside the hotel is a large banquet and entertainment hall (Pano Hall) with the capacity of 1,000 guests, meeting rooms, bars and a gift shop. The pool has surrounding private cabanas and a poolside bar, Coconut. There are a total of 14 restaurants and bars.

The spa offers facials, massages, pedicures, manicures, Lomi Lomi, hot stone massages, and the signature 24-karat gold leaf facial. There is also a sauna, whirlpool, steam room, and health club. Steelman Partners was the architect and interior designers. shop12 was the lighting designers for the major expansion in 2010.

Thunder Valley Casino Resort hosts a number of concerts and shows in the summertime in their outdoor amphitheater.

Entertainment

The Venue 
The Venue at Thunder Valley is a new $100 million entertainment venue which opening on February 17, 2023 with a performance by the Eagles. It hosts 4,500 seats inside a 150,000 square foot state-of-the art theater.

Events

Philanthropy
Using the revenue generated from Thunder Valley, the UAIC gives about $1 million annually to nonprofit groups in Placer County. Some beneficiaries of ongoing and previous donations include the Lighthouse Counseling & Family Resource Center, Sutter Auburn Faith Hospital Foundation, and Foothill Volunteer Center.

In January 2005, the UAIC donated $250,000 to assist Habitat for Humanity International's (HFHI) relief efforts in southern Asia following the 2004 Indian Ocean earthquake and tsunami.

In January 2010, the UAIC donated $50,000 to Partners in Health for their efforts in the 2010 Haiti earthquake aftermath.

See also
List of casinos in California

References

External links
 
 Thunder Valley Spa
 United Auburn Indian Community
 California Tribal Business Alliance
 

2003 establishments in California
Amphitheaters in California
Buildings and structures in Placer County, California
Casino hotels
Casinos in California
Hotel buildings completed in 2003
Hotels established in 2003
Hotels in California
Resorts in California
Station Casinos
Native American casinos
Native American history of California